The Dallas crime family or Dallas Mafia was an Italian-American Mafia crime family based in Dallas, Texas.

History

Carlo Piranio

Carlo Piranio, a native of Sicily, immigrated to the U.S. circa 1901 with his brother Joseph. They first settled in Shreveport, Louisiana. Carlo began the Dallas faction of the American Mafia in 1921 with Joseph as his underboss. Carlo, later described as the "original head of the Mafia in Texas," was born about 1876 in Corleone, Sicily, the same hometown as early New York Mafia boss Giuseppe Morello. Piranio's marriage to an eighteen-year-old woman, recently arrived from Italy, occurred in 1903. In 1904, a son, Angelo, was born to Carlo and Clementia Piranio. The Piranio relocation to Dallas, Texas, occurred sometime between the marriage and the Shreveport birth of Angelo in 1904. The April 1910 U.S. Census says the family lived temporarily at 774 Main Street in Dallas. The household included Carlo and Clementia, young Angelo, and Joseph Piranio and his new bride Lena. Carlo ran a real estate business from his home. Joseph worked as a grocery salesman. Joseph was not entirely settled in Texas. He moved back to Louisiana for a few years. He, his wife and two young daughters returned to Dallas by 1914. Carlo died of natural causes in 1930. Joseph took over the family after Carlo's death. He owned a number of bars, controlled numerous gambling operations, and ran some minor labor rackets through his construction business.

Joseph Civello
Joseph Civello was born in 1902, in rural West Baton Rouge Parish, Louisiana. He was the second child born to Philip and Catherine Civello. His father, a farm laborer, had been in the United States since 1900. The Civello family grew to include seven children. The family remained in West Baton Rouge until 1923, when Philip relocated the clan to Dallas and opened a grocery store.

Civello married in November 1929. He and his wife Mary moved into Philip Civello's home at 1902 Moser Avenue. Joseph worked as a salesman for his father's grocery store.

Death of Joe DeCarlo
Law enforcement officers quickly became aware of Joseph Civello. He was convicted of Prohibition violations in 1926 and served forty days in jail. On July 12, 1928, Civello was again arrested on liquor charges. His arrest was part of a series of raids that nabbed a total of twenty-two suspected bootleggers around the city. Civello was arrested on St. Paul Street with two other men, Ernest Calchano and Joe DeCarlo. DeCarlo was an important bootlegger in the Dallas area and had recently begun refusing to send tribute payments to Carlo Piranio. Civello was selected to administer Mafia discipline.

Just two days after their arrest together, Civello and DeCarlo met inside the St. Paul Drugstore at the intersection of St. Paul and Bryan Streets. Civello happened to be carrying a loaded shotgun at the time. As the men stood close to each other, the shotgun went off. DeCarlo was shot in the stomach. Rather than flee, Civello remained with the mortally wounded DeCarlo, protesting that his weapon had fired by accident. DeCarlo, with his dying breath, confirmed Civello's story.

Civello was arrested and charged with murder. He continued to insist that the killing was accidental. A Dallas grand jury gave considerable weight to DeCarlo's dying statement. Within two days, Civello was released on his own recognizance. The grand jury continued its investigation into DeCarlo's death and decided on July 27 not to indict Civello.

Apalachin Meeting
Joseph Civello assumed control in 1956, when Joseph Piranio died at age 78.  Civello attended the infamous Apalachin Meeting of Mafia leaders in 1957, a time when he controlled narcotics, gambling, prostitution and night clubs in most of Texas. After the Apalachin Meeting, the FBI began keeping closer tabs on Civello. On January 13, 1960, Civello was indicted for conspiracy and perjury offenses. Judge Irving R. Kaufman sentenced him and nineteen other mob leaders that were at Apalachin to five years in prison. Ten months later, a U.S. Appeals Court overturned the convictions of the twenty men. Prosecutors had proven conspiracy, the court decided, but had not proven that the conspiracy was designed to accomplish some unlawful act.

Post-Civello
After Civello's death in 1970, some law enforcement intelligence officers surmised that local restaurant owner Joseph Ianni, a long-time friend of Civello, became head of the organization. Ianni's only legal trouble was a 1946 liquor law violation and he was reported only to have nothing more than a "vague association" with Marcello. According to D Magazine, he "had fewer direct ties to New Orleans than Civello, only what some intelligence officers call 'friend of a friend of a friend' relationships".

Historical leadership

Boss

1910–1930 – Carlo Piranio
1930–1956 – Joseph Piranio
1956–1970 – Joseph Civello

See also

Benny Binion

References

Italian-American crime families
Gangs in Texas